Ivan Lendl defeated Boris Becker in the final, 6–2, 7–6, 6–3 to win the singles title at the 1985 Nabisco Masters.

John McEnroe was the two-time defending champion, but lost in the first round to Brad Gilbert.

Seeds

  Ivan Lendl (champion)
  John McEnroe (first round)
  Mats Wilander (quarterfinal)
  Stefan Edberg (first round)

Draw

See also
ATP World Tour Finals appearances

External links
 1985 Masters Singles results

Singles